Van Aken is a Dutch surname meaning "from Aachen ". It may refer to:

Hans van Aken (1552–1615), German mannerist painter
Hans Vanaken (born 1992), Belgian footballer
Hein van Aken, Flemish 13th-century priest
Jan van Aken (1614–1661), Dutch golden age painter and engraver.
Jan van Aken (born 1961), a German politician and member of the Bundestag
Jeroen van Aken birth name of Hieronymus Bosch (c.1450-1516), Netherlandish painter
Joost van Aken (born 1994), Dutch footballer
Joseph Van Aken (c. 1699 – 1749), Flemish portrait, genre and drapery painter
Sam van Aken, an associate Professor of Sculpture at Syracuse University known for his creation of Tree of 40 Fruit
Sebastiaen van Aken (1648–1722), Flemish painter
William R. Van Aken (1912–1993), American lawyer

Dutch-language surnames
Surnames of Dutch origin